The Fine Arts Department is a government department of Thailand, under the Ministry of Culture. Its mission is managing the country's cultural heritage.

History
The department was originally established by King Vajiravudh in 1912, split off from the Palace's Religious Affairs Office, and was primarily concerned with protecting Buddhist monuments. In 1926, during the reign of King Prajadhipok, the department was merged into the Royal Society, along with the Museum Department and Archaeology Department, in effect consolidating several cultural heritage-related agencies. In 1933, following the abolition of absolute monarchy, the Royal Society's archaeological arm was split off and re-established as the Fine Arts Department under the Ministry of Education (then known as the Ministry of Public Instruction). It became part of the Ministry of Culture from 1952 until 1957 (when the ministry was dissolved), and again in 2002 when the ministry was re-established.

Functions 
The Fine Arts Department is responsible for the study and management of archaeological sites and objects, as well as the operation of the country's national museums, which it does under the legal framework of the Act on Ancient Monuments, Antiques, Objects of Art and National Museums, B.E. 2504 (1961). It also covers intangible cultural heritage, literature, and historical archives. Among its constituent bureaus are the National Archives and the National Library. Its budget for  FY2019 is 3,070.1 million baht.

Organization
The Fine Arts Department is composed of the following divisions:
 Office of the Secretariat
 Archaeology Division
 Underwater Archaeology Division
 Center for Information Technology on Art and Culture
 Office of Performing Arts
 Office of Traditional Arts
 Office of National Museums
 Office of Literature and History
 Office of Architecture
 Office of the National Archives
 Office of the National Library
 Twelve Regional Offices

References

 
Government departments of Thailand
Cultural heritage of Thailand
National heritage organizations